Battle of Ravenna may refer to:

 Battle of Ravenna (432), in which Aetius and Bonifatius waged a civil war in the Western Roman Empire
 Battle of Ravenna (475), between Orestes and Julius Nepos
 Battle of Ravenna (476), in which Odoacer captured Ravenna and brought the Western Roman Empire to an end
 Battle of Ravenna (729), between the Byzantine Empire and the Italians
 Battle of Ravenna (1512), between the French and Spanish-Papal during the War of the League of Cambrai

See also
 Siege of Ravenna (490–493), in which Theoderic the Great besieged Odoacer
 Siege of Ravenna (539–540), in which the Eastern Roman Empire besieged Vitiges